Iris Rogers (née Cooley), is a former English badminton player.

Badminton career
Born Iris L Cooley  she came to prominence in the early fifties when playing doubles. Partnering June Timperley née White the pair broke the stranglehold of the Danish pairs during the era of Danish domination by claiming three All England women's doubles titles. She also claimed an All England mixed doubles titles with John Best.

Although mainly concentrating on doubles Rogers was also a very good singles player reaching the final of the All England in 1954 before losing out to Judy Devlin. Other successes included nine Irish open titles, nine Scottish open titles, three Dutch opens, one Swedish open and one Danish open title.

She represented England and won a silver medal in the women's doubles with Angela Bairstow, at the 1966 British Empire and Commonwealth Games in Kingston, Jamaica.

Personal life
She married in William Rogers in 1956 and competed as Rogers and not Cooley afterwards.

Medal record at the All England Badminton Championships

References

Badminton players at the 1966 British Empire and Commonwealth Games
English female badminton players
Commonwealth Games medallists in badminton
Commonwealth Games silver medallists for England
1930 births
Living people
Medallists at the 1966 British Empire and Commonwealth Games